Bruno II of Berg (German: Bruno II von Berg) (c. 1100  1137) was the Archbishop of Cologne from 1131 until 1137.
Bruno II of Berg was a son of Count Adolf III of Berg. In 1119 he was mentioned as a Provost in Cologne, and he became the provost of St. Gereon in Cologne in 1127. In 1130 he was elected the Archbishop of Trier, but refused.

Bruno was selected on Christmas Day of 1131 by King Lothar of Germany and a papal legate as the Archbishop of Cologne. In 1133 he converted his own keep at Altenberg into a monastery. Bruno died in 1137 in Apulia on campaign with King Lothair of Germany against Roger II of Sicily.

Bruno 2

Bruno 2
Bruno 2
Bruno 2

House of Berg
House of Limburg-Stirum
12th-century Roman Catholic archbishops in the Holy Roman Empire